Enron (stylised as ENRON) is a 2009 play by the British playwright Lucy Prebble, based on the Enron scandal.

Productions

Enron premiered at the Chichester Festival Theatre (11 July – 29 August 2009), before London transfers to the Jerwood Downstairs at the Royal Court Theatre from 17 September to 7 November 2009 and then the Noël Coward Theatre from 16 January to 14 August 2010 (after a cast change on 8 May). Directed by Rupert Goold with associate Sophie Hunter, the cast featured Samuel West as Jeffrey Skilling, Tom Goodman-Hill as Andrew Fastow,  Amanda Drew as Claudia Roe, and Tim Pigott-Smith as Ken Lay.

Enron premiered on Broadway at the Broadhurst Theatre on 8 April 2010 in previews, with the official opening on 27 April. Directed by Rupert Goold with associate Sophie Hunter, the scenic and costume design was by Anthony Ward, lighting by Mark Henderson, music and sound by Adam Cork, video and projection by Jon Driscoll and movement by Scott Ambler. Gregory Itzin starred as Kenneth Lay with Norbert Leo Butz as Jeffrey Skilling, Marin Mazzie as Claudia Roe, and Stephen Kunken as Andrew Fastow. The Broadway production of Enron closed on 9 May 2010; it lasted just over a month. The Guardians critic Michael Billington speculated that it was The New York Times "hostile" review that contributed to its premature closure. He also stated its failure to earn nominations at the Tony Awards in major categories was its "kiss of death".

Enron was premiered in Reykjavik City Theatre in September 2010, in Dublin as part of the Dublin Theatre Festival in October 2010 and in Helsinki (Helsinki City Theatre) in November 2010.

Plot
The play concerns the financial scandal and collapse of "ENRON", the American energy corporation, based in Texas. Enron executive Jeffrey Skilling and his boss Kenneth Lay are shown, as well as Skilling's protege Andy Fastow, who rises to become the chief financial officer.

Premiere casts

Response
Tim Walker, the Sunday Telegraph critic, gave it five stars, drawing parallels with the plot to that of King Lear. "While it isn't done any more to say this in the financial pages, I say it here with conviction: Enron is a strong buy," he wrote.

In The New York Times review of the Broadway production, Ben Brantley wrote, contrary to some other critics, "even with a well-drilled cast that includes bright Broadway headliners like Norbert Leo Butz and Marin Mazzie, the realization sets in early that this British-born exploration of smoke-and-mirror financial practices isn’t much more than smoke and mirrors itself. Enron is fast-paced, flamboyant and, despite the head-clogging intricacy of its business mathematics, lucid to the point of simple-mindedness. But as was true of the company of this play's title, the energy generated here often feels factitious, all show (or show and tell) and little substance."

Michael Billington, critic for The Guardian, dubbed Brantley's comments an "obtuse and hostile review", stating that "Enrons fate was sealed the moment Brantley's review appeared [...] As a fellow critic, I respect Brantley's right to his opinion; what is dismaying is his failure to see what Prebble and Goold were up to [...] But no serious play on Broadway can survive a withering attack from The New York Times, which carries the force of a papal indictment".

Awards and nominations
Enron won the 2009 Theatrical Management Association award for Best New Play and was also nominated for Best Performance in a Play (Samuel West). In the 2009 Evening Standard Theatre Awards, it won Best Director and was nominated for Best Actor (for West) and Best Play (for Prebble).

The play received Tony Award nominations for the 2010 Best Original Score (Music and/or Lyrics) Written for the Theatre, 2010 Best Featured Actor in a Play (Kunken), 2010 Best Lighting Design of a Play (Mark Henderson), and 2010 Best Sound Design of a Play (Adam Cork).

References

External links

 Enron on Broadway Official Website
 
 Zinoman, Jason. "The Enron Bubble Bursts Again, This Time at the Tonys." Vanity Fair. 4 May 2010.
 Zinoman, Jason. "Theater: Are We as Undiscerning as the English Think We Are?." Vanity Fair. 6 May 2010

2009 plays
English plays
Plays based on actual events
Plays set in the 1990s
Plays set in the 21st century
Plays set in the United States
Plays by Lucy Prebble